Alberto Orlandez Gamboa, also known as "El Caracol" ("The Snail"), is a Colombian drug lord and the former leader of the North Coast Cartel.

Orlandez Gamboa led the cartel from the coastal city of Barranquilla. He was known for his smuggling methods, hiding cocaine in mustard crates, sawdust and cough medicine to hide the odor. He also smuggled cocaine in engine parts, cement and ceramic tiles.

Orlandez Gamboa was arrested on June 6, 1998, extradited to the United States in 2000 and pleaded guilty to drug trafficking charges. He was sentenced to 40 years in prison.

References

Living people
Colombian drug traffickers
People convicted of money laundering
Colombian crime bosses
People extradited from Colombia to the United States
Prisoners and detainees of the United States federal government
Colombian people imprisoned abroad
1956 births
People convicted of kidnapping
People convicted of bribery